Goytacaz might refer to:

 Goytacaz Futebol Clube, Brazilian football club
 Goytacaz language, Brazilian language
 Campos dos Goytacazes, Brazilian municipality